Aspra Spitia is a town in the municipal unit Distomo-Arachova-Antikyra, in Boeotia, Greece.  In 2011, its population was 1,578.

History
Aspra Spitia was founded in 1960, planned by Doxiadis Associates to house industrial workers for Aluminum of Greece's nearby aluminum plant. Its alternate name is "Paralia Distomou". Aspra Spitia is situated on the north coast of the Corinthian Gulf, 2 km northeast of Antikyra, 10 km southwest of Distomo and 25 km west of Livadeia. The 2010 film Attenberg was shot in Aspra Spitia.

Population

Persons 
 Konstantinos Apostolos Doxiadis

External links 
 Constantinos A. Doxiadis: Aspra Spitia. A New "Greek" City
 Municipality of Distomo-Arachova-Antikyra

References

Gulf of Corinth
Populated places in Boeotia